Be Happy is the debut studio album by Japanese singer and songwriter Rina Aiuchi. It was released on 24 January 2001 by Giza Studio. The eurobeat-sounded J-pop album has yielded four singles, including the Japan top 5 hit "Koi wa Thrill, Shock, Suspense".  The album reached number 3 on the Oricon albums chart in its first week and charted for seven weeks.

In support of the album, Aiuchi embarked on her first concert tour, Rina Aiuchi Club Circuit 2001 "Be Happy" from January 2001

Promotion

Singles
"Close to Your Heart" was released on 23 March 2000 as the lead single of the album. The song served as the theme song to the Japanese animated television series Monster Rancher. The eurobeat-influenced J-pop song written by Aiuchi herself and Aika Ohno reached number nineteen on the Oricon singles chart, selling approximately 64,000 copies nationwide.

The second single from the album, "It's Crazy for You" was released on 31 May 2000. The sex-themed eurobeat song peaked at number sixteen on the Oricon chart.

On 26 July 2000, the follow-up single "Ohh! Paradise Taste!!" was released as the third single from the album. The eurobeat-influenced J-pop song only managed to reach number twenty-three and sell approximately 43,000 copies in Japan, becoming her second lowest-charting song behind "Hanabi" (2010).

The fourth single from the album, "Koi wa Thrill, Shock, Suspense" was released on 25 October 2000. The song served as the opening theme song to the Japanese animated television series Case Closed. The opening movie left a big impression on the viewers, depicting the protagonist of the series, Conan Edogawa dancing Para Para dance to the song. "Koi wa Thrill, Shock, Suspense" was a commercial success, reaching number 5 on the Oricon singles chart and selling approximately 105,000 copies in Japan. The song has been certificated Gold by Recording Industry Association of Japan (RIAJ) and remains as Aiuchi's second best-selling song as of September 2018.

Tour

Rina Aiuchi Club Circuit 2001 "Be Happy"

Rina Aiuchi Club Circuit 2001 "Be Happy" is the first concert tour by Japanese singer and songwriter Rina Aiuchi. It was launched in support of her debut studio album, Be Happy (2001).

Track listing

Personnel
Credits adapted from the liner notes of Be Happy.

Rina Aiuchi – vocals, producer, backing vocals 
Aika Ohno - backing vocals 
Secil Minami - backing vocals 
Yujirou - backing vocals 
Koji Yamamoto - backing vocals 
Takumi Ito - backing vocals 
King Opal - rap 
Yoshinobu Ohga - guitar 
Kazuko Ikeda - director
Akio Nakajima - mixing
Taku Oyabu - mixing
Katsuyuki Yoshimatsu - assistant engineer
Masahiro Shimada - mastering
Manabu Uemoto - art director, designer
Teruo Hayashi - photographer
Yumi Inui - hair and make-up artist
Miwa Kamise - styling
Kanonji - executive producer

Charts

Weekly charts

Year-end charts

Certification and sales

References 

2001 debut albums
Being Inc. albums
Giza Studio albums
Japanese-language albums
Albums produced by Daiko Nagato